Donnell Irrais Ó Conchobair, Gaelic-Irish lord, .

Donell was a member of the Clan Muircheartaigh Uí Conchobhair. His father was Manus mac Muircheartaigh Muimhneach. In 1273, following the murder of Henry Butler, Lord of Umallia, he was banished from Umallia and Erris.

The Annals of the Four Masters, sub anno 1274, state Tiernan, son of Hugh O'Rourke, Lord of Breifny, and Donnell, son of Manus, who was son of Murtough Muimhneach, most illustrious throughout all Ireland for hospitality and prowess, died.

References

 The History of Mayo, p. 300, Hubert T. Knox, 1908.
 A Lost Tribe - The Clan Murtagh O'Conors, Katherine Simms, pp. 1–22, Journal of the Galway Archaeological and Historical Society, volume 53, 2001

External links
http://www.ucc.ie/celt/published/T100005C/index.html

Medieval Gaels from Ireland
Irish lords
People from County Mayo
13th-century Irish people